Hymn to Life is the second solo album by Timo Tolkki. Unlike his first solo album (Classical Variations and Themes), Hymn to Life does not present Tolkki as a fast and classical heavy metal guitarist, but as a diverse songwriter. The album deals with Tolkki's personal beliefs and thoughts about life and encourages the listener to believe in themselves. Despite the implication of some song names, Tolkki uses strong criticism against religions.

Tolkki took inspiration from a variety of genres, including pop, rock, and classical music. Doom metal characteristics may also be found in the song "Father," which is Tolkki's tribute to his late father. The album did not receive positive reception from the metal audience, maybe owing to its non-Stratovarius sound. 

Guest vocal appearances on the album are Michael Kiske on the track "Key to the Universe" and Sharon den Adel on "Are You the One?".

The track "Hymn to Life" includes a speech from the film The Great Dictator delivered by Charlie Chaplin.

Track listing
"Primal (intro)" - 0:20
"Key to the Universe" - 4:05
"Now I Understand" - 4:24
"Divine" - 4:32
"Little Boy I Miss You" - 4:37
"I Believe" - 5:27
"Are You the One?" - 5:05
"Father" - 6:24
"Fresh Blue Waters" - 4:16
"Dear God" - 5:09
"It's Xmas Morning" - 4:21
"Hymn to life" - 11:36

Japanese Edition includes a string version of "Key to the Universe".

Credits
Timo Tolkki - guitar, bass, vocals, keyboards
Anssi Nykänen - drums
Mika Ervaskari- piano, keyboards
Michael Kiske - vocals on track 2
Sharon den Adel - vocals on track 7

Produced and mixed by Timo Tolkki

References

2002 albums
Timo Tolkki albums